A chaplain is, traditionally, a cleric (such as a minister, priest, pastor, rabbi, purohit, or imam), or a lay representative of a religious tradition, attached to a secular institution (such as a hospital, prison, military unit, intelligence agency, embassy, school, labor union, business, police department, fire department, university, sports club), or a private chapel.

Though originally the word chaplain referred to representatives of the Christian faith, it is now also applied to people of other religions or philosophical traditions, as in the case of chaplains serving with military forces and an increasing number of chaplaincies at U.S. universities. In recent times, many lay people have received professional training in chaplaincy and are now appointed as chaplains in schools, hospitals, companies, universities, prisons and elsewhere to work alongside, or instead of, official members of the clergy. The concepts of a multi-faith team, secular, generic or humanist chaplaincy are also gaining increasing use, particularly within healthcare and educational settings.

Types of chaplaincies

Education
School chaplains are a fixture in religious and, more recently, secular schools. In religious schools the role of the chaplain tends to be educational and liturgical. In secular schools the role of the chaplain tends to be that of a mentor and a provider of pastoral care services. Chaplains provide care for students by supporting them during times of crisis or need. Many chaplains run programs to promote the welfare of students, staff and parents including programs to help students deal with grief, anger or depression. Chaplains also build relationships with students by participating in extracurricular activities such as breakfast programs, lunchtime groups and sports groups. School chaplains can also liaise with external organizations providing support services for the school. Many schools now have pupil support departments with several mentors whose jobs are to look out for the pupils and always be there to help but they give no religious or spiritual guidance because of multiculturalism and diverse opinions on religion and beliefs. Chaplains have also been referred to as spiritual animators (also faith animators or pastoral animators) based on the French concept of animation spirituelle or spiritual care.

In Australia chaplains in state schools have, controversially, been funded by the federal government and local communities since 2007. Australian chaplains assist school communities to support the spiritual, social, and emotional well-being of their students. Chaplaincy services are provided by non denominational companies.  there are 2339 chaplains working in Australian secular schools, along with 512 student welfare workers. Australian schools will lose the option of appointing secular social workers under the national school chaplaincy program, for which the Abbott government has found an extra $245m in the 2014 budget funding.

Similarly, in Scotland the focus of school chaplaincy is on welfare and building positive relationships joining students on excursions and sharing meals. Chaplains are also non-denominational and act as a link between the school community and society. Like Australian chaplains it is expected that they will not proselytise.

In Ireland chaplaincy takes a very different approach in which chaplains are expected to teach up to four hours of class instruction per week and are usually Catholic themselves. Chaplaincy duties include visiting homes, religious services, retreats and celebrations, as well as counseling.

Higher education
For higher education, chaplains are appointed by many colleges and universities, sometimes working directly for the institution, and sometimes as representatives of separate organizations that specifically work to support students, such as Hillel International for Jews or the Newman Centers for Catholics. In the United States, the National Association of College and University Chaplains works to support the efforts of many of these chaplains, helping chaplains minister to the individual faith of students, faculty, and staff, while promoting inter-religious understanding. Chaplains often also oversee programs on campus that foster spiritual, ethical, religious, and political and cultural exchange, and the promotion of service.

Industrial chaplains

Law and police
Law enforcement or police chaplains work with and as part of local, regional, county, state, and national or federal law enforcement and provide a variety of services within the law enforcement community. They should not be confused with prison chaplains, whose primary ministry is to those who are incarcerated either awaiting trial or after conviction. The role of the law enforcement chaplain deals primarily with law enforcement personnel and agencies. The chaplain responds to these unique needs and challenges with religious guidance, reassuring and trustworthy presence, resources and counseling services. The law enforcement chaplain offers support to law enforcement officers, administrators, support staff, victims and their families, and occasionally even the families of accused or convicted offenders. Law enforcement chaplaincy is a ministry of presence and must have the proper training if they are working with law enforcement officers. Some ministries such as Chaplain Fellowship Ministries requires LEO chaplains to be certified in Public Safety Chaplaincy before becoming certified as a LEO chaplain. Most chaplains are uniformed and some may have a rank. They will always wear distinguishing insignia or markings to denote their chaplain rather than lawman status.

Fire departments
Chaplains working with fire departments provide the same kind of support as do chaplains working with law enforcement agencies, and sometimes face even greater danger working with the wounded in often very dangerous surroundings.

At the scene of the September 11 attacks on the World Trade Center in New York City, for example, New York City Fire Department chaplain Mychal Judge was killed by flying debris from the South Tower when he re-entered the lobby of the North Tower of the World Trade Center, shortly after administering last rites to a wounded firefighter.

Labor

Many workplace chaplains (commonly called industrial chaplains) are sponsored by labor unions, including in some cases chaplains for police and firefighters. The United Auto Workers Union (UAW) sponsors a chaplaincy program for all of its local unions. In New York City, the Electricians Union (IBEW Local 3) has affiliated Catholic, Episcopalian, Greek Orthodox and Masonic organizations with chaplains.

Union chaplains are often viewed as advantageous as they are accountable to the employees and not corporate management.

Corporate
Some businesses, large or small, employ chaplains for their staff or clientele. Services provided may include employee assistance and counseling services; wellness seminars; conflict management and mediation; leadership and management development; and trauma/serious incident response. In 2007, 4,000 corporate chaplains were reported to be working in the U.S., with the majority being employees of specialist chaplaincy companies such as Marketplace Chaplains USA and Corporate Chaplains of America. In 2014, Marketplace Chaplains USA reported employing over 2,800 chaplains in 44 states and over 960 cities. The organization added an international arm in 2006; Marketplace Chaplains International serves Canada, the U.K., Mexico and Puerto Rico. Capellania Empresarial provides corporate chaplaincy services in Paraguay. Chaplains without Borders has been providing corporate and other chaplaincy services in Australia since 2005.

Military

Military chaplains provide pastoral, spiritual and emotional support for service personnel, including the conduct of religious services at sea, on bases or in the field. Military chaplains have a long history; the first English military-oriented chaplains, for instance, were priests on board proto-naval vessels during the 8th century.  Land-based chaplains appeared during the reign of King Edward I. The current form of military chaplain dates from the era of the First World War.

Chaplains are nominated, appointed, or commissioned in different ways in different countries. A military chaplain can be an army-trained soldier with additional theological training or an ordained person nominated to the army by religious authorities. In the United Kingdom the Ministry of Defence employs chaplains but their authority comes from their sending church. Royal Navy chaplains undertake a 16-week bespoke induction and training course including a short course at Britannia Royal Naval College and specialist fleet time at sea alongside a more experienced chaplain.  Naval chaplains called to service with the Royal Marines undertake a grueling five-month-long Commando Course and, if successful, wear the commandos' Green Beret.  British Army chaplains undertake seven weeks training at the Armed Forces Chaplaincy Centre Amport House and the Royal Military Academy Sandhurst. Royal Air Force chaplains must complete a 12-week Specialist Entrant course at the RAF College Cranwell followed by the Chaplains' Induction Course at the Armed Forces Chaplaincy Centre Amport House of a further two weeks. The United States Navy will often give chaplain training to cadets seeking a theological route in the military. Additionally, they are granted instant employment as a Navy chaplain once ordained. Additionally, in the United States military, chaplains must be endorsed by their religious affiliation in order to serve in any facet of the military. In some cases, like that of the U.S. Navy, a Religious Program Specialist may be appointed to help alleviate some of the duties bestowed upon Naval chaplains.

Military chaplains are normally accorded officer status, although Sierra Leone had a Naval Lance Corporal chaplain in 2001. In most navies, their badges and insignia do not differentiate their levels of responsibility and status. By contrast, in air forces and armies, they typically carry ranks and are differentiated by crosses or other equivalent religious insignia. However, United States military chaplains in every branch carry both rank and Chaplain Corps insignia.

Though the Geneva Conventions does not state whether chaplains may bear arms, they specify (Protocol I, June 8, 1977, Art 43.2) that chaplains are non-combatants. In recent times both the UK and US have required chaplains, but not medical personnel, to be unarmed.  Other nations, notably Norway, Denmark and Sweden, make it an issue of individual conscience.  Captured chaplains are not considered Prisoners of War (Third Convention, August 12, 1949, Chapter IV Art 33) and must be returned to their home nation unless retained to minister to prisoners of war.

Inevitably, a significant number of serving chaplains have died in action. 100 chaplains of the U.S. Army and the U.S. Marine Corps were killed in action during World War II: a casualty rate greater "than any other branch of the services except the infantry and the Army Air Corps" (Crosby, 1994, pxxiii). Many have been decorated for bravery in action (five have won Britain's highest award for gallantry, the Victoria Cross). The Chaplain's Medal for Heroism is a special U.S. military decoration given to military chaplains who have been killed in the line of duty, although it has to date only been awarded to the famous Four Chaplains, all of whom died in the  sinking in 1943 after giving up their lifejackets to others. In addition to these, five other U.S. chaplains have been awarded the Medal of Honor: Chaplain (LCDR) Joseph T. O'Callahan, USN (World War II); Chaplain (CPT) Emil Kapaun, USA (Posthumous, Korean War); Chaplain (LT) Vincent Capodanno, USN (Posthumous, Vietnam War); Chaplain (MAJ) Charles J. Watters, USA (Posthumous, Vietnam War); and Chaplain (CPT) Angelo J. Liteky, USA (Vietnam).  (Later in life, Liteky changed his name to Charles, left the Catholic priesthood, became an anti-war activist, and renounced his Medal of Honor). Chaplain Fellowship Ministries military chaplains are nondenominational. To be considered for appointment to serve as a military chaplain, candidates must first be ordained and have an ecclesiastical endorsement by a valid religious faith group recognized by the Department of Defense. Candidates must meet all DOD requirements. The Chaplain Fellowship had military chaplains serving in Iraq and now in Afghanistan.

In 2006, training materials obtained by U.S. intelligence showed that insurgent snipers fighting in Iraq were urged to single out and attack engineers, medics, and chaplains on the theory that those casualties would demoralize entire enemy units. The United States European Command has co-sponsored an annual International Military Chiefs of Chaplains Conference every year since 1991 to consider the various issues affecting chaplaincy ministry and other military personnel.  At times, the existence of military chaplains has been challenged in countries that have a separation of Church and State. However one of the major issues affecting chaplaincy and military personnel is that of moral injury arising as a result of international conflicts and terrorism.

Music
Some chaplains use live music as a therapeutic tool. Music can aid in healing, access core faith and emotions, and help to build rapport in the chaplaincy relationship.

Parliamentary

Some nations, including the United States and the United Kingdom, have chaplains appointed to work with parliamentary bodies, such as the Chaplain of the United States Senate, the Chaplain of the United States House of Representatives, and Chaplain to the Speaker of the House of Commons. In addition to opening proceedings with prayer, these chaplains provide pastoral counseling to congressional members, their staffs, and their families;  coordinate the scheduling of guest chaplains, who offer opening prayers; arrange and sometimes conduct marriages, memorial services, and funeral services for congress, staff, and their families; and conduct or coordinate religious services, study groups, prayer meetings, holiday programs, and religious education programs, as well.

Royalty and nobility
Monarchs have held private religious services as a long-standing right along with a privilege of appointing their own chaplains to serve them and their families. 
Since the late medieval period, Dukes and lesser ranking nobles have had a capacity to name a number of Chaplains. The question of who has authority to qualify chaplains was the heart of the Investiture Controversy in medieval Germany.

Prison

Prison chaplains can be a "safety valve, through listening and pro-social intervention" in potentially explosive situations. They also reduce recidivism by linking offenders to positive community resources, and in the work they do to help offenders change their hearts, minds and directions.

Rabbi Philip R. Alstat (1891–1976), who—in addition to work as a chaplain in New York hospitals and senior citizen facilities—served for three decades as the Jewish chaplain for "The Tombs", the Manhattan Detention Facility, once described his service as follows: "My goals are the same as those of the prison authorities—to make better human beings. The only difference is that their means are discipline, security, and iron bars.
Mine are the spiritual ministrations that operate with the mind and the heart."

In Canada in 2013, a $2-million contract for chaplaincy services for federal prisons was awarded to Kairos Pneuma Chaplaincy Inc., a company newly formed by five current and former federal prison chaplains. About "2,500 volunteers, many of them of minority faiths, would also continue providing services." There has however, been very little research looking at the role of chaplains and volunteers working within correctional facilities.

Sports
Chaplains to sports communities have existed since the middle of the 20th century and have significantly grown in the past 20 years. The United States, United Kingdom and Australia have well established Christian sports chaplaincy ministries.

Sports chaplains consist of people from many different walks of life. Most commonly, the chaplains are ministers or full-time Christian workers but occasionally, chaplaincy work is done without charge or any financial remuneration. Often, sports chaplains to a particular sport are former participants of that sport. This helps the chaplain to not only provide spiritual support and guidance to a player, but also to give them the ability to empathize and relate to some of the challenges facing the participant with whom they are ministering.

Animal

Veterinary chaplains serve people and their animals, ministering with regards to the spirituality associated with animals and their connections with humans. A major function is grief support and prayer. Other services include hospice support while animals are cared for near the end of their lives; support in animal health crises, including at the veterinary hospital; conducting services for animal blessings, naming/adopting ceremonies, and end of life celebration ceremonies. Veterinary chaplains may also offer sermons and spiritual guidance on the human/animal bond and our responsibilities toward animals; and some may visit nursing homes and hospitals with therapeutic animal assistants. Other veterinary chaplains may provide blessings for animal care workers; assist with human/animal communication; and offer alternative healing for animals such as animal Reiki or acupuncture.

The Emerson Theological Institute, headquartered in Oakhurst, California, and working within the New Thought spiritual approach, offers degree programs up to the doctorate level in Humane Religious Studies, the cornerstone of which is a veterinary chaplain program. The Animal Ministry Institute (AMI), run by the Rev. Paula T. Webb, also offers an online chaplain program for continuing education but without college credit. A less formal online certificate program is offered by the Rev. Karen j Kobrin Cohen, a veterinary chaplain based in Florida.

Colonial
A colonial chaplain was appointed to a colony. The term is commonly used to refer to the chaplain appointed as a non-military chaplain to one of the Crown Colonies from the late 18th century or early 19th century. Richard Johnson (1756–1827) was the first colonial chaplain appointed to the new prison colony at New South Wales in 1786.

Environmental
Environmental chaplaincy is an emerging field within chaplaincy. Environmental chaplains (also known as eco-chaplains, Earth chaplains, nature chaplains) provide spiritual care in a way that honors humanity's deep connection to the earth. Environmental chaplains hold many roles. They may support people working on the frontlines of issues like climate change or other environmental issues or they may support people impacted by industrial or other disasters by providing pastoral care, presence, and rituals. Environmental chaplains may also bear witness to the Earth itself and represent the merging of science and spirituality. Their role can be to "usher in a new conscience and consciousness to find contentment, the appreciation of inner riches over outer wealth, quality over quantity" using universally appreciated values, such as honesty and vision. Sarah Vekasi created a vision of eco-chaplaincy inspired by Joanna Macy's The Work that Reconnects, and saw eco-chaplaincy as a path to facilitating the "Great Turning," which is described as the turning away from a business-as-usual way of being and turning toward a life-sustaining way that protects people and the planet

Health care
Many hospitals, nursing homes, assisted living facilities, and hospices employ chaplains to assist with the spiritual, religious, and emotional needs of patients, families and staff. Chaplains are often employed at residential care facilities for the elderly (RCFE) and skilled nursing facilities (SNF) as well. Chaplains care for people of all faiths and no faith. In mental health work, chaplains are highly skilled, working with other therapists as part of a multi-disciplinary team, especially where the patient's mental health is associated with their religiosity, or where their mental well-being can be aided by spiritual care.

In the United States, health care chaplains who are board-certified have completed a minimum of four units of Clinical Pastoral Education training through The Association for Clinical Pastoral Education, Healthcare Chaplains Ministry Association, The Institute for Clinical Pastoral Training; or The College of Pastoral Supervision and Psychotherapy and may be certified by one of the following organizations: The Spiritual Care Association, The Association of Professional Chaplains, The National Association of Catholic Chaplains, Neshama: Association of Jewish Chaplains (formerly The National Association of Jewish Chaplains), The Association of Certified Christian Chaplains, or The College of Pastoral Supervision and Psychotherapy. Certification typically requires a Masters of Divinity degree (or its equivalent), faith group ordination or commissioning, faith group endorsement, and four units (1600 hours) of Clinical Pastoral Education (the Military Chaplains Association of the United States of America does require more, but they are a dod2088 501c-3 military support group founded in 1954 by Military Chaplains). The Chaplain Innovation Lab, set up in 2008, has responded rapidly and creatively to the unique pastoral demands of the COVID-19 pandemic; it has 3000 members world-wide.

In Canada, health care chaplains may be certified by the Canadian Association for Spiritual Care.

In the UK, health care chaplains are employed by their local NHS Trust (Health Boards in Scotland and Wales) or by charities associated with delivering health care such as a hospice or private hospital. The NHS in England publishes occasional guidance on chaplaincy practice. UK Chaplains are drawn from a range of faith and belief backgrounds, and are not necessarily ordained or a recognised faith leader. In Scotland Healthcare Chaplaincy developed to be 'generic' from 2002 onwards; that is the chaplaincy provides spiritual care to all people and chaplains do not represent a faith or belief group. They may work on a full-time and part-time basis, and some work unpaid but with formal recognition for a faith or belief group regarding their training and status and may be termed honorary chaplain. The term Voluntary Chaplain is frowned on. The largest professional body for the UK is the College of Health Care Chaplains. Scotland historically had a distinct professional body, the Scottish Association of Chaplains in Healthcare (SACH) but this has since dissolved. Northern Ireland also has the Healthcare Chaplains Association. Membership of the College of Health Care Chaplains was historically not open to Catholic Priests as it carries with it the membership of the Unite Trade Union, but this changed in April 2018. Chaplains working in a palliative care setting may also choose to join the Association of Hospice and Palliative Care Chaplains. Other less formal networks also exist supporting Chaplaincy in Paediatric settings and GP based Chaplaincy.

Within the UK there is also the UK Board of Healthcare Chaplaincy (UKBHC) which has been set up in order to regulate the ministry and professional practice of health care chaplains. They publish a code of conduct which all registered chaplains are bound to abide by. The UKBHC has successfully applied to the Professional Standards Authority to be an accredited register of healthcare chaplains demonstrating that it meets the Authority's high standards in areas such as governance and training.

Peer-reviewed journals that publish scholarly articles and research on healthcare chaplaincy include the Journal of Health Care Chaplaincy (USA), the international journal Health and Social Care Chaplaincy (UK) and the Journal of Religion and Health (US).

Cruise
Working on board cruise ships, cruise chaplains provide pastoral and spiritual support to both passengers and crew members. With the co-operation of cruise companies, chaplains normally stay on board for the specific duration of a cruise. Catholic seafarers' charity Apostleship of the Sea currently deploys chaplains on board P&O Cruises and Cunard Line ships during the Christmas and Easter periods. While ministering to passengers are part of Apostleship of the Sea's chaplains role, their main focus is the welfare of the crew, who can often spend many months at sea away from home.

Domestic

A domestic chaplain was a chaplain attached to a noble household in order to grant the family a degree of self-sufficiency in religion. The chaplain was freed from any obligation to reside in a particular place so could travel with the family, internationally if necessary, and minister to their spiritual needs. Further, the family could appoint a chaplain who reflected their own doctrinal views. Domestic chaplains performed family christenings, funerals and weddings and were able to conduct services in the family's private chapel, excusing the nobility from attending public worship.

In feudal times most laymen, and for centuries even most noblemen, were poorly educated and the chaplain would also be an important source of scholarship in the household, tutoring children and providing counsel to the family on matters broader than religion. Before the advent of the legal profession, modern bureaucracy and civil service, the literate clergy were often employed as secretarial staff, as in a chancery. Hence the term clerk, derived from Latin clericus (clergyman). This made them very influential in temporal affairs. There was also a moral impact since they heard the confessions of the elite.

The domestic chaplain was an important part of the life of the peerage in England from the reign of Henry VIII to the middle of the 19th century. Up until 1840, Anglican domestic chaplains were regulated by law and enjoyed the substantial financial advantage of being able to purchase a license to hold two benefices simultaneously while residing in neither.

Many monarchies and major noble houses had, or still have, several domestic or private chaplains as part of their Ecclesiastical Household, either following them or attached to a castle or other residence. Queen Elizabeth II had 36 Anglican chaplains, in addition to chaplains extraordinary and honorary chaplains appointed to minister to her. Castles with attached chaplains generally had at least one Chapel Royal, sometimes as significant as a cathedral. A modern example is St George's Chapel, Windsor Castle, also the home of the Order of the Garter.

Other

There are also chaplains to private clubs, television or radio stations, family, community teams, groups such as Boys' and Girls' Brigade companies and Scout troops, airports, cruise ships, nightclubs, and theaters.

The term can also refer to priests attached to Catholic convents. There is also the position of Chaplain of His Holiness, a title granted by the Pope to certain priests who become part of the Papal Household and work with the Papal Chapel. Prior to 1968 they were called Supernumerary Privy Chamberlains.

In German-speaking countries, the German "Kaplan" is often translated as "chaplain", but in fact the two words are false friends.  "Kaplan" as generally used in German-speaking countries is better translated as curate in British usage, or assistant pastor in American usage.

In the Church of England and other Anglican churches, a Bishop's "examining chaplain(s)" are those (usually priests) who examine candidates for ordination and advise the bishop as to their suitability. This role, and ordination processes, have varied greatly in the churches' history and between the churches.

At the University of Oxford, the term Caplan is used for the position equivalent to president, for the head of the Cymdeithas Dafydd ap Gwilym, (Dafydd ap Gwilym Society) the Oxford University Welsh society, named after the 14th-century Welsh poet, Dafydd ap Gwilym.

See also
 Religion in United States prisons
 United States military chaplain symbols

References

Further reading
Paul Alexander (2008). Cascadia Publishing House: PEACE TO WAR: Shifting Allegiances in the Assemblies of God Peace to War: Shifting Allegiances in the Assemblies of God].  Telford, PA: Cascadia Publishing/Herald Press.  This book contains a scholarly analysis of the impact of Pentecostal military chaplaincy during the 20th century.
Baker, Alan T. (2021). Foundations of Chaplaincy: A Practical Guide. Grand Rapids: Eerdmans. .
Bergen, Doris. L., (ed), 2004.  The Sword of the Lord: Military Chaplains from the First to the Twenty-First Century.  University of Notre Dame Press 

Nay, Robert. "The Operational, Social, Religious Influences Upon The Army Chaplain Field Manual, 1926–1952" .
Norman, James (2004). At the Heart of Education: School Chaplaincy and Pastoral Care. Dublin: Veritas Publications. .
Paget, Naomi & McCormack, Janet (2006). The Work of the Chaplain. Valley Forge: Judson Press. .
Smith, John C. Chaplain. International Chaplains Association.
VandeCreek, Larry & Lucas, Art (2001). The Discipline for Pastoral Care Giving: Foundations for Outcome Oriented Chaplaincy. Binghamton: The Haworth Press. .

External links
 
 
 "chaplain", Merriam-Webster Collegiate Dictionary
 "chaplain", Chaplaincy certification and Training
 Unit Chaplain on the WW2 Movie Fury 

 
Ecclesiastical titles
Religious occupations